Ivy Rose Levan (born January 20, 1987) is an American singer, songwriter, model and actress from Bentonville, Arkansas. At 16, Levan moved to Los Angeles to pursue a music career, eventually signing to Cherrytree Records and Interscope Records. Levan made her acting debut starring as "Cynthia" in the 2010 film Drop Dead Gorgeous which followed by other television appearances, including her most recent in Fox's The Rocky Horror Show film.

In 2013, Levan released her debut EP album under Interscope Records titled Introducing the Dame where it peaked at No. 1 on the Billboard Next Big Sound charts. The EP features the most popular single from the album "Hot Damn". She released the first single, titled "Biscuit", from her first studio album, on January 13, 2015. Her debut album, No Good, was released on August 7, 2015.

Early life
Levan was born in Tulsa, Oklahoma, and raised in Bentonville, Arkansas. The singer moved to Los Angeles with her mother when she was 16 years old to pursue a music career. Of the experience, Levan says "I just knew I needed to get out of there as fast as I could, so two weeks before I was supposed to graduate high school, I took off for L.A. with my mama." After experimenting with various musical styles, Levan began to use her Southern upbringing as a frame of reference, and as an influence which can be found in her music. During her career, Levan has worked with many artists of note, across genres. Among others, the singer has collaborated with Ben Weinman of The Dillinger Escape Plan, Tomo Miličević of Thirty Seconds to Mars, Sting, and Diplo.

Musical career

2013–14: Career beginnings
In 2013, Levan released Introducing the Dame where it peaked at No. 1 on the Billboard Next Big Sound charts. The EP features her most popular single from the album "Hot Damn", which has racked up over 1 million views on YouTube. During the album's release, Levan was interviewed on Glamour Magazine and featured on CBS News' "The Feed." Levan was also featured on MTVu's Freshman segment, securing the winning spot twice and was dubbed as the "New It-Girl".

In December 2013, Levan was featured in a television commercial for the Beats By Dre Color Solo Headphones alongside Chris Cole, Jasmine Villegas, August Alsina, Nipsey Hussle, Nyjah Huston, Serena Williams and Alex Midler. Levan made her television performance debut February 2, 2014 on the Late Show with David Letterman in which she performed Drive My Car with Sting and Mike Einziger on day two of the Late Show's Beatles Tribute Week. Additionally, in June 2013, Levan supported Fitz & The Tantrums touring mostly the Mid-West and North-Eastern United States as well as Texas. During this tour, she also performed at clubs in support of the LGBT community. In October 2013, she supported Emeli Sandé. On April 17, 2014, Levan performed with Lisa Fischer for the 25th Anniversary of the Rainforest Fund Benefit Concert.

2015–present: No Good and The Rocky Horror Picture Show
In 2015, Levan released the first single "Biscuit" to her debut studio album titled No Good, which was released on August 7, 2015. She also sang the theme song "Who Can You Trust?", for the comedy film Spy. In 2016, it was announced that she would be singing the opening credits and starring as Usherette in Fox TV's production of The Rocky Horror Picture Show, which premiered in October 2016.

In August 2017, she announced that she was in a new record deal with BMG. Along with this, she announced a new EP but didn't announce a release date. In November 2018, Levan announced the release date of her upcoming single "Her" which was released on November 8, 2018.

Artistry
Levan's influences include Tina Turner, Mariah Carey, Ray Charles, Madonna, Ol' Dirty Bastard, Slayer and Beyoncé. Her musical style is sometimes dubbed as "Swamp-hop", a mixture of raw sounding soul music & synths. Levan's vocals have been persistently compared to Christina Aguilera by many music critics.

Personal life
Levan is openly bisexual and is also a model. She is signed to Ford Models, and has done ads for JCPenney, Payless ShoeSource and runway for Mercedes Benz Fashion Week.

Discography

Filmography

References

External links

 
 
 

1987 births
Living people
21st-century American women singers
American women pop singers
Bisexual actresses
Bisexual singers
Bisexual songwriters
LGBT people from Arkansas
LGBT people from Oklahoma
American LGBT singers
American LGBT songwriters
Musicians from Tulsa, Oklahoma
Singers from Oklahoma
Interscope Records artists
21st-century American singers
20th-century LGBT people
21st-century LGBT people